The Men's 100 metre butterfly competition of the 2016 FINA World Swimming Championships (25 m) was held on 7 and 8 December 2016.

Records
Prior to the competition, the existing world and championship records were as follows.

The following records were established during the competition:

Results

Heats
The heats were held at 10:49.

Semifinals
The semifinals were held at 19:51.

Semifinal 1

Semifinal 2

Final
The final was held at 19:30.

References

Men's 100 metre butterfly